Ján Sojka (born 7 October 1990) is a Slovak football midfielder who currently plays for RSC Hamšík Academy in 3. Liga.

Career
Sojka made his Fortuna Liga debut on 20 July 2019, in a sold-out home fixture against defending champions, Slovan Bratislava. Sojka was featured in a starting-XI. After over an hour he was replaced by summer arrival, Michal Klec. While on the pitch, Sojka witnessed two goals of Slovan, scored by Aleksandar Čavrić and Andraž Šporar, from a penalty. Later on Šporar's second goal and a sole goal of Pohronie, scored by Patrik Abrahám, had set the final score to 1:3.

Sojka made another Fortuna Liga appearance on 31 August 2019, in Myjava, in a neutral-soil away fixture against iClinic Sereď. Sojka came on in the 66th minute as a replacement for Jakub Sedláček, with the score set at 2:2, following goals by Zachara and Patrik Abrahám for Pohronie and iClinic's goal by Alex Iván and own-goal by Pohronie's defender Ján Nosko. Pohronie went on to go one down after a goal by Tomáš Hučko, but Patrik Jacko had set the score to the final 3:3 in the stoppage time. This was Sojka's last appearance for Pohronie.

Sojka was one of Pohronie's founding players, joining the newly formed club in 2012. During the 8 seasons with the club he collected over 150 league starts across three top divisions of Slovak league system, scoring over a dozen of goals. He was there with both promotions of the club to 2. Liga and the Fortuna Liga.

Honours
Pohronie
2. Liga: 2018–19
3. Liga: 2012–13

References

External links
 
 
 Eurofotbal profile

1990 births
Living people
Sportspeople from Banská Bystrica
Slovak footballers
Association football midfielders
FK Rakytovce players
TJ Sokol Dolná Ždaňa players
FK Pohronie players
3. Liga (Slovakia) players
2. Liga (Slovakia) players
Slovak Super Liga players